Walnut Ridge may refer to the following places in the United States:

 Walnut Ridge, Arkansas
 Walnut Ridge, Delaware
 Walnut Ridge, Indiana

See also 
 Walnut Ridge (Amtrak station), a train station in Walnut Ridge, Arkansas
 Walnut Ridge High School (disambiguation)